Edward Julius Elsaesser (March 10, 1904 – January 7, 1983) was an American politician and a U.S. Representative for the 43rd district of the state of New York.

Biography
Elsaesser was born in Buffalo, New York on March 10, 1904, the son of John and Ida (Steinke) Elsaesser, and graduated from the University at Buffalo Law School in 1926.  He was admitted to the bar in 1927 and practiced in Buffalo.  He married Anna Hossack on December 6, 1933.

Career
Elsaesser was a Republican candidate for the New York State Assembly from Erie County's 3rd District in 1936. He was a Republican State committeeman from 1937 to 1945, and a Delegate to the 1940 Republican National Convention.

Elected to the House of Representatives as a Republican in 1944 and reelected in 1946, Elsaesser served from January 3, 1945 to January 3, 1949. He was an unsuccessful candidate for reelection in 1948, and for his Congressional district's Republican nomination in 1950.  After leaving Congress, Elsaesser continued to practice law.

Death
Elsaesser died in Williamsville, New York on January 7, 1983 (age 78 years, 303 days). He is interred at Williamsville Cemetery, Williamsville, New York.

References

External links
 

1904 births
1983 deaths
Politicians from Buffalo, New York
University at Buffalo Law School alumni
New York (state) lawyers
Republican Party members of the United States House of Representatives from New York (state)
20th-century American lawyers
Burials in New York (state)
20th-century American politicians